WWE Hall of Fame (2011) was the event which featured the introduction of the 12th class to the WWE Hall of Fame. The event was produced by WWE on April 2, 2011 from the Philips Arena in Atlanta, Georgia. The event took place the same weekend as WrestleMania XXVII. The event was hosted by Jerry Lawler. A condensed one-hour version of the ceremony aired on the USA Network the following Monday, before Raw, Originally The Fabulous Freebirds were supposed to be inducted at this event but got moved to the 2016 event  In March 2015 the ceremony was added to the WWE Network.

Inductees

Individual
 Class headliners appear in boldface

Group

Celebrity

References

WWE Hall of Fame ceremonies
2011 in professional wrestling
Professional wrestling in Atlanta
Events in Georgia (U.S. state)
2011 in Georgia (U.S. state)
April 2011 events in the United States